Florian Seidl (born March 2, 1979, in Salzburg) is a vehicle and product designer from Austria. He studied Industrial Design at the University of Arts and Industrial Design Linz, the Hong Kong Polytechnic University and got his master's degree from the Royal College of Art in London.

Since 2008 he has been living and working in Turin, Italy. At Centro Stile Fiat he was a senior member of the design team that developed the Fiat 500 successfully into a range of different models and other projects that can now be seen on the road. In 2015 he joined Lavazza to set up a compact in-house design team from scratch. In that function, he is responsible for the corporate design of Lavazza. Numerous products designed for the Italian group have won important design awards and during the last few years he helped to position Lavazza firmly on the map of modern Italian design.

He was named on Perspective's 40 under 40 list for Product Design in 2019 and his work was exhibited on several occasions. 
Amongst others at the RCA's Great Exhibition, the Global Cities exhibition at the Tate Modern and the London Transport Museum.

Awards
 iF Design Awards
 Red Dot Design Awards
 German Design Awards
 A' Design Awards
 BigSEE Product Design Award, winner, 2019
 Perspective 40 under 40, Product Design, 2019
 Worshipful Company of Carmen Transportation Design Award, first prize, 2007
 Worshipful Company of Coachmakers and Coach Harness Makers Award, shortlisted, 2007
 Geoff Lawson Jaguar Scholarship, shortlisted, 2007
 Interior Motives Awards, finalist, 2006
 Emanuel und Sophie Fohn Stipendium, scholarship, 2006
 Hong Kong Austrian Educational Foundation, scholarship, 2003

Jury Membership 

 A'Design Award
 European Good Design Awards
 Azerbaijan Design Award

References

Monocle (UK), September 2007, No 06, p. 138

External links
 University of Art and Industrial Design, Linz, Austria
 Hong Kong Polytechnic University, Hong Kong, China
 Royal College of Art, London, UK

 BigSee Product Design Award, Florian Seidl, 2019

 Perfect Moka, Interview, 2020 

 RCA, The Great exhibition, Florian Seidl, 2007, London, UK
 Tate Modern, Global Cities Exhibition, 2007, London, UK
 London Transport Museum, London, UK

 cardesignnews - RCA degreeshow 2007
 businessweek - The Great Exhibition
 conceptcar.co.uk - RCA Vehicle Design Show 2007
 Movement Design Bureau - Last Chance: RCA's Great Exhibition
 The Independent - Vehicle design: So what's the next big idea?

 cardesignnews - RCA plasticons

 Telegraph - New tubes for London?

1979 births
Living people
Alumni of the Royal College of Art
Austrian designers
Austrian automobile designers
Austrian industrial designers